Lagnus is a spider genus of the jumping spider family, Salticidae. It occurs only in the Philippines and Fiji.

Name
The species name longimanus is Latin for "with a long hand".

Species
, the World Spider Catalog accepted the following species:
Lagnus edwardsi Zhang &  Maddison, 2012 – Philippines
Lagnus longimanus L. Koch, 1879 (type species) – Fiji
Lagnus monteithorum Patoleta, 2008 – Fiji

References

External links
 Photograph of Lagnus sp.

Salticidae
Salticidae genera
Spiders of Asia
Spiders of Oceania
Taxa named by Ludwig Carl Christian Koch